Matthias Bachinger and Dieter Kindlmann were the defending champions, but decided not to participate.Giulio Di Meo and Adrian Ungur won the final against Juan Pablo Brzezicki and Alexander Peya 7–6(6), 3–6, [10–7].

Seeds

  Martin Slanar /  Lovro Zovko (quarterfinals)
  Brian Battistone /  Purav Raja (semifinals)
  Martin Emmrich /  Frank Moser (semifinals)
  Juan Pablo Brzezicki /  Alexander Peya (finals)

Draw

Draw

External links
Draw

Riviera di Rimini Challenger
Clay court tennis tournaments
Riviera di Rimini Challenger